This is a list of political scandals in Belgium from 1830 to present.

List of scandals
 Victor Jacobs affair (1881)
 Julien Lahaut assassination (1950)
  (end 1970s)
 KS affair (end 1980s)
 Marc Dutroux affair (1980s-1990s)
 Albert Canal pipeline affair (1990s)
  (1990s)
 Cools assassination (1991)
 Agusta scandal (scandal broke early 1990s)
 Aralco affair (early 1990s)
 OMOB affair (early 1990s)
 UNIOP-INUSOP affair (early 1990s)
 Hormone affair (1990s)
 Dioxine crisis (1999)
 Carolorégienne affair (2005)
 ICDI affair (2006)
 Fall of the Leterme Government (2008)

See also
 Parliamentary inquiries by the Belgian Federal Parliament
 Salamander (TV series) - a TV series covering a fictional scandal in Belgium

References

 
Politics of Belgium
scandals
Belgium